Czech tennis players Barbora Krejčíková and Kateřina Siniaková have formed a successful doubles tennis partnership since 2013. They have won seven major tournaments and eight other Women's Tennis Association (WTA) titles. With additional wins at the 2020 Olympics and the 2021 WTA Finals, they are the only women's doubles team to complete the career Super Slam jointly.

Siniaková and Krejčíková are respectively ranked by the WTA No. 1 and No. 2 in doubles .

History

2013–2017: Junior success and early professional years 

In 2013, Krejčíková and Siniaková, both aged 17, won three of the year's four junior Grand Slam doubles tournaments. They were paired together when each of them "couldn't find a partner" for doubles at the French Open, and went on to win the event without dropping a set. A month later, they repeated the feat at Wimbledon, and they completed their junior careers with the same result at the US Open. Including two other tournament wins, this stretched their team win–loss record at junior events to 24–0 (48–0 in sets). Siniaková and Krejčíková had peak junior International Tennis Federation (ITF) rankings of No. 2 and No. 3 respectively.

Following their junior triumphs, the team played intermittently from 2014 to 2017. Siniaková was the first to establish herself on the WTA Tour, cracking the top 50 in singles in 2016, while Krejčíková initially struggled, not reaching the top 100 in singles until 2020. This gap in rankings sometimes made it difficult for them to enter the same tournaments, but they did manage to play at several events together in 2016. At the French Open, on the way to their first major women's doubles semifinal, they beat the team of Martina Hingis and Sania Mirza that was attempting to finish a non-calendar-year Grand Slam. They additionally reached the quarterfinals of the US Open.

2018–2020: first Grand Slam titles, Fed Cup win, No. 1 ranking 

After a break of more than a year, Krejčíková and Siniaková reunited in 2018. Early that year, they reached their first two WTA Tour doubles finals as a pair in Shenzhen and Miami. In the summer, they reached and won their first Grand Slam finals together: At the French Open, they beat the Japanese pair Eri Hozumi/Makoto Ninomiya in a quick straight-set final, and in the Wimbledon final, they outlasted Nicole Melichar/Květa Peschke . These wins made Krejčíková/Siniaková the first doubles team to complete the Channel Slam since Kim Clijsters/Ai Sugiyama in 2003. The pair nearly replicated their junior triple as the top-seeded team at the US Open, but lost in the semifinals to eventual champions Ashleigh Barty/CoCo Vandeweghe. Krejčíková and Siniaková were the first team in 2019 to qualify for the season-ending WTA Finals, where on their debut in October they finished runners-up to Tímea Babos and Kristina Mladenovic. Shortly before season's end, the team jointly attained the No. 1 ranking for the first time. Additionally, they were named the WTA Doubles Team of the Year.

The next year, Krejčíková and Siniaková qualified for the WTA Finals for a second straight year but did not win any major titles in 2019. They won two tournaments this year, the Rogers Cup in Canada and the Linz Open in Austria. Elise Mertens and Aryna Sabalenka beat them  in the Indian Wells final. At the majors, the Czechs lost in the quarterfinals of the Australian Open to eventual champions Samantha Stosur/Zhang Shuai; as defending champions and top seeds, they lost in the first round of the French Open; and they reached the semifinals of Wimbledon, where they lost to Gabriela Dabrowski/Xu Yifan. They fell in round-robin play at the WTA Finals.

In the 2020 season disrupted by the COVID-19 pandemic, Krejčíková and Siniaková reached at least the semifinals of all six events they entered together. Their only title this year came at the Shenzhen Open. In major play, the team's run to the Australian Open semifinals was ended by No. 1 seeds Hsieh Su-wei/Barbora Strýcová, and they lost the French Open semifinal to eventual champions Babos/Mladenovic. The WTA Finals were cancelled this year.

2021–present: return to No. 1, Olympic gold, career Grand Slam 

In a "resurgent" season in 2021, Krejčíková and Siniaková won multiple important titles. In February, they started strong by taking home the Gippsland Trophy in Australia and finishing runners-up at the Australian Open to Mertens/Sabalenka. While they lost in the early rounds of several spring hardcourt events, on the clay in Madrid they won the doubles title over Dabrowski and Demi Schuurs . In June, Krejčíková turned in a historic performance at 2021 French Open, becoming the first player to win the tournament in singles and doubles simultaneously since Mary Pierce in 2000. This event, in which Krejčíková saved a match point, marked her rise to prominence in singles. In the doubles final, she and Siniaková beat No. 14 seeds Bethanie Mattek-Sands/Iga Świątek . In the quarterfinals of Wimbledon, the pair fell to Veronika Kudermetova and Elena Vesnina , despite having four match points for themselves. The Czechs were seeded No. 1 at the Tokyo Olympics in July–August; they won three super tiebreaks (including over Kudermetova/Vesnina) en route to the gold medal match, in which they beat the Swiss team Belinda Bencic/Viktorija Golubic . They were also top-seeded at and won the 2021 WTA Finals, where they twice beat Hsieh/Mertens (in the group stage and final), and Siniaková retook the No. 1 ranking. The pair was named the WTA Doubles Team of the Year for the second time.

Krejčíková and Siniaková went undefeated at the majors in 2022, winning all three Grand Slams that they entered. At the Australian Open, they won their fourth major by beating Anna Danilina and Beatriz Haddad Maia in a close final, . They were unable to defend their French Open title because Krejčíková had to pull out of the doubles draw after testing positive for COVID-19. As No. 2 seeds at Wimbledon, they beat top-seeded Mertens/Zhang in the final . In September, their victory at the US Open completed their career Grand Slam; in the final against the unseeded pair of Caty McNally and Taylor Townsend, the Czechs were down a set and  before rallying—Siniaková said "we calmed down a little"—to win . They again reached the final of the WTA Finals, but lost  to Mertens/Kudermetova, despite leading  at one point in the deciding tiebreak. They were again named WTA Doubles Team of the Year.

The duo continued playing well at the start of 2023, making their first ever title defense by winning the Australian Open over Shuko Aoyama/Ena Shibahara in the final . This was their seventh Grand Slam title and stretched their major win streak to 24 matches. They continued their perfect record on the year at Indian Wells, winning the final in a super tiebreak  over Beatriz Haddad Maia/Laura Siegemund.

Playing style 

Krejčíková and Siniaková are known as a team with very solid on-court communication, helped by their many years playing together, and a "never give up" attitude. Other skills include quick reflexes at the net (especially Siniaková), smart hitting from the baseline (especially Krejčíková), and lobbing ability. The team makes much use of the I-formation, with the net player crouching at the center of the court while the server stands on the baseline behind her.

The contrast of the players' personalities has been noted since their first year together. Krejčíková is considered the less excitable one; she once referred to Siniaková as "my wilder half".

Performance timeline 

Current as of 2023 BNP Paribas Open.

List of finals

Junior finals

WTA Tour finals

Doubles: 21 (15 titles, 6 runner–ups) 

Note: Tournaments sourced from official WTA archives

Awards

WTA Awards 
 Doubles Team of the Year: 2018, 2021, and 2022

See also 
List of Grand Slam women's doubles champions
List of WTA number 1 ranked doubles tennis players

Notes

References

External links 

Barbora Krejčíková and Kateřina Siniaková from the Women's Tennis Association
Barbora Krejčíková and Kateřina Siniaková from the International Tennis Federation

Tennis doubles teams
Czech female tennis players
WTA number 1 ranked doubles tennis players
Grand Slam (tennis) champions in girls' doubles
French Open junior champions
Wimbledon junior champions
US Open (tennis) junior champions
Grand Slam (tennis) champions in women's doubles
Australian Open (tennis) champions
French Open champions
Wimbledon champions
US Open (tennis) champions
Tennis players at the 2020 Summer Olympics
Medalists at the 2020 Summer Olympics
Olympic medalists in tennis
Olympic tennis players of the Czech Republic
Olympic gold medalists for the Czech Republic
Living people